The following is a list of chiefs of mission from the United States to Jordan.

The first chief of mission, Gerald A. Drew held the title of Envoy Extraordinary and Minister Plenipotentiary. The second chief of mission, Joseph C. Green, was appointed as an envoy but promoted to as Ambassador Extraordinary and Plenipotentiary, as the Legation Amman was raised to embassy status on August 27, 1952. Every chief of mission since has held the title of United States Ambassador.

See also
Jordan – United States relations
Foreign relations of Jordan
Ambassadors of the United States
 Embassy of Jordan, Washington, D.C.
 List of Jordanian ambassadors to the United States

References

United States Department of State: Background notes on Jordan

External links
 United States Department of State: Chiefs of Mission for Jordan
 United States Department of State: Jordan
 United States Embassy in Amman

Jordan
Main
United States